Charlton may refer to:

People
 Charlton (surname)
 Charlton (given name)

Places

Australia 
 Charlton, Queensland
 Charlton, Victoria
 Division of Charlton, an electoral district in the Australian House of Representatives, in New South Wales

Canada 
 Charlton, Ontario
 Charlton Island, Nunavut

England 
 Hundred of Charlton, a hundred in the Wokingham area of Berkshire
 Charlton, Bristol, a village in Gloucestershire near Bristol, demolished in 1949
 Charlton, Hampshire
 Charlton, Hertfordshire
 Charlton, London, formerly a village, now a district
 Charlton, Northamptonshire
 Charlton, Northumberland
 Charlton, Oxfordshire, a location in Wantage
 Charlton, Shropshire, a location
 Charlton, Kilmersdon, Mendip district, Somerset
 Charlton, Shepton Mallet, Mendip district, Somerset
 Charlton, Taunton Deane, Somerset
 Charlton, Surrey (formerly Middlesex)
 Charlton, West Sussex
 Charlton, Brinkworth, Wiltshire
 Charlton, Pewsey Vale, Wiltshire
 Charlton, Donhead St Mary, South Wiltshire
 Charlton, Worcestershire, near Fladbury
 Charlton, Hartlebury, a location in Worcestershire

New Zealand
 Charlton, New Zealand

United States
 Charlton, Massachusetts
 Charlton, New York
 Charlton County, Georgia
 Charlton Township, Michigan

Buildings in England
 Charlton Castle, Shropshire
 Charlton House, London
 Charlton House, Charlton Mackrell, Somerset
 Charlton House, Wraxall, Somerset

Other uses
 Charlton (ship), two ships
 Charlton Athletic F.C., an English football team based in the London district of that name
 Charlton Avenue (Hamilton, Ontario), Canada
 Charlton Comics, American comic book company (1946–1986)
 Charlton Press, a Canadian book publishing company which produces price guides and other books on collectibles
 Charlton School, a coeducational secondary school in Telford, Shropshire, England
 Charlton College of Business, University of Massachusetts Dartmouth

See also  
 Carlton Television, a British television franchise 
 Charlton-on-Otmoor, Oxfordshire
 Charlton Abbots, Gloucestershire
 Charlton Adam, Somerset
 Charlton Horethorne, Somerset
 Charlton Kings, a suburb of Cheltenham
 Charlton Mackrell, Somerset
 Charlton Musgrove, Somerset
 Queen Charlton, Somerset
 Charlton-All-Saints, near Downton, South Wiltshire
 Charleton, parish, Devon, England
 Charltons, Redcar and Cleveland, North Yorkshire, England
 Charleston (disambiguation)
 Charlestown (disambiguation)
 Carlton (disambiguation)
 Chalton, Bedfordshire, England
 Chalton, Hampshire, England